Eleudis Valentim (born 1 May 1992) is a Brazilian judoka.

She is the gold medallist of the 2017 Judo Grand Prix Zagreb in the -52 kg category.

References

External links
 

1992 births
Living people
Brazilian female judoka
21st-century Brazilian women
20th-century Brazilian women